is a Japanese photographer.

Hayashi was born in Dalian, China, in 1946, but his family then quickly moved to Japan, first to Beppu (Ōita) and then to Kyoto. He worked in a darkroom for a year after graduating from high school, and in 1965 moved to Tokyo, where he studied at the Tokyo College of Photography. After graduating, he worked for two years as an assistant of Hajime Sawatari, and then started to freelance for fashion magazines. Since 1983 he has been teaching at the Tokyo College of Photography.

Hayashi works in black and white, often depicting a Tokyo rendered off-kilter by speculative and showy development.
 
Hayashi has participated in group exhibitions including “Empathy”, which went to Rochester (NY) and elsewhere in 1987. His first solo exhibition (in the Shinjuku Nikon Salon) came in 1983; he has exhibited intermittently since then.

Hayashi's only book to date is Zoo, a collection of photographs in zoos that managed to show the animals in (and sometimes dwarfed by) their man-made environs while barely showing any people; it has been praised for the purity (achieved with the help of retouching) and composition of its images. Zoo won the Higashikawa Prize in 1986. A series of photographs of roof spaces, Roof, won praise as a continuation of the themes of Zoo.

Hayashi also won an award from Konica  in 1995.

Book

Zoo. Tokyo: the author, 1986. Includes 28 black and white plates. Captions (the names of the zoos) in English; no other text.

Notes

References

 Gendai Shashin no keifu / History of Modern Photos II. Tokyo: Nikkor Club, 2001. 
 Iizawa Kōtarō. Review of Roof. In Shashin no genzai: Kuronikuru 1983–1992 (Photography now: A chronicle 1983–1992). Tokyo: Mirai-sha, 1993. . Review originally published in Nippon Camera, July 1985.
  Obinata Kin'ichi. Capsule review of Zoo. P. 200. In Shashinshū o yomu: Besuto 338 kanzen gaido (Reading photobooks: A complete guide to the best 338). Tokyo: Metarōgu, 1997. .
  Sekiji Kazuko. "Hayashi Takanobu". In Nihon shashinka jiten / 328 Outstanding Japanese Photographers. Kyoto: Tankōsha, 2000. P. 257. . Despite its alternative title in English, the text is all in Japanese.
Shashin toshi Tōkyō / Tokyo/City of Photos. Tokyo: Tokyo Metropolitan Museum of Photography, 1995. Catalogue of an exhibition held in 1995. Plates 76–93 are from the series “A picture of happiness” (Hare no fūkei). (Other photographers whose work appears are Hiroh Kikai, Ryūji Miyamoto, Daidō Moriyama, Shigeichi Nagano, Ikkō Narahara, Mitsugu Ōnishi, Masato Seto, Issei Suda, Akihide Tamura, Tokuko Ushioda, and Hiroshi Yamazaki.) Captions and texts in both Japanese and English.
Exhibition notice by S K Josefsberg Studio (Portland, Oregon) with two sample photos.

1946 births
Living people
Japanese photographers
Tokyo College of Photography alumni